Time Being is an album by drummer Peter Erskine featuring pianist John Taylor and bassist Palle Danielsson recorded in 1993 and released on the ECM label

Reception
The Allmusic review by Scott Yanow awarded the album 3 stars stating "This CD is actually most interesting for the playing of Taylor who contributes three of the originals and plays in a style not that far from Keith Jarrett. In general the music starts out pretty quiet but builds its intensity and holds one's interest".

Track listing
All compositions by Peter Erskine except as indicated
 "Terraces" (Palle Danielsson, Peter Erskine, John Taylor) - 7:08 
 "For the Time Being" - 5:13 
 "If Only I Had Known" - 6:05 
 "Evansong" (John Taylor) - 8:06 
 "Page 172" (Taylor) - 6:02 
 "Liten Visa Till Karin" (Staffan Linton) - 4:57 
 "Bulgaria" - 4:48 
 "Ambleside" (Taylor) - 6:36 
 "Phrase One" (Kenny Wheeler) - 5:19 
 "Palle's Headache" (Danielsson) - 5:26 
 "Pieds-En-L'Air" (Peter Warlock) - 4:36 
Recorded at Rainbow Studio in Oslo, Norway in November 1993

Personnel
Peter Erskine — drums
John Taylor — piano 
Palle Danielsson — bass

References

ECM Records albums
Peter Erskine albums
1994 albums
Albums produced by Manfred Eicher